Xenophthalmichthys danae is a species of pencil smelt found in deep waters to .  This species has been found in the western Pacific Ocean and the Atlantic Ocean and is suspected to be circumtropical.  This species grows to a length of  SL.

References 

 

Fish described in 1925
Fish of the Atlantic Ocean
Fish of the Pacific Ocean
Microstomatidae
Monotypic fish genera